Great White is an American rock band. 

The Great White or Great White may also refer to:

Animals
 Great white shark, a species of shark
 Great white egret, a species of egret
 Great white heron, several species
 Great white owl, a species of owl
 Great white pelican, a species of pelican

People
 Greg Norman (born 1955), Australian golf player nicknamed The Great White Shark
 Paul Wight (born 1972), American pro wrestler sometimes introduced as The Great Wight
 Sheamus (born 1978), Irish professional wrestler nicknamed The Great White

Roller coasters
 The Great White (Morey's Piers), a wooden roller coaster at Morey's Piers
 The Great White (SeaWorld San Antonio), a steel roller coaster at SeaWorld San Antonio

Entertainment 
 Great White (album), the first album by Great White
 Great White (1981 film), an Italian film similar to Jaws
 Great White (2021 film), an Australian survival horror film
 Great White Shark (comics), a fictional comic book supervillain
 The Great White Hope, a 1970 film about a boxing champion
 Great White Games, a games company
 Great White Way, nickname for a section of Broadway in Manhattan
 Great White North, SCTV sketch featuring Bob and Doug McKenzie

Other uses
 Great White Brotherhood, beings of great power in Theosophy or New Age
 Great White Fleet, nickname for the United States Navy battle fleet of 1907-1909

See also

 Great White Hope (disambiguation)
 Great White North (disambiguation)